Xevioso (alternately: Xewioso, Heviosso, Hevioso) is a god of thunder of the So region in Dahomey mythology. He is the twin brother of Gun, and is one of the children of Mawu and Lisa.

See also 
 Shango

References 

This divinity is also known as Jivodun (that is, Vodun of the sky)
Dahomean gods
Thunder gods
Voodoo gods